Lázaro Cárdenas is on Line 9 of the Mexico City Metro System between Metro Centro Médico and Metro Chabacano at the intersection of Eje Central and Eje 3 Sur.  It links to the Eje Central Trolebus line.

Name and iconography
The station is named after Lázaro Cárdenas, and the station logo shows a portrait in profile of him.

History
From 23 April to 21 June 2020, the station was temporarily closed due to the COVID-19 pandemic in Mexico.

Ridership

Gallery

References

External links
 

Mexico City Metro Line 9 stations
1988 establishments in Mexico
Railway stations opened in 1988
Mexico City Metro stations in Cuauhtémoc, Mexico City